Tiveden is a long and wide densely forested rocky ridge in Sweden, throughout history notorious for its wilderness and dangers; historically a hiding place for outlaws. In historic times it, along with Tylöskog and Kolmården, formed the border between the land of the Swedes and the land of the Geats.

It was established in 1983, and administratively belongs to the municipalities of Karlsborg and Laxå.

History 

The name is very old and disputed. -Ved is cognate to English Wood and the first part of its name, Ti-, either means "god" or refers to the god Týr, both descendants of the word meaning “god”. Tiveden separates Närke from Västergötland, and was formerly a frontier between the Geats and the Swedes.

The national park area has never been inhabited, but there are several ancient remains of human activities such as worshipping grounds and sacrificial sites.

Geography 

The forest has small lakes with red waterlilies. When they were discovered they provided the European varieties of red waterlilies that are in cultivation. The folklore tale of how this became goes as follows:

The animal life is scarce, but the forest houses a substantial population of western capercaillie. Nowadays there are small populations of wolves, lynxes and wolverines in Tiveden. Bears have also been sighted.

See also 
Related forests:
Tylöskog
Kolmården
Trollkyrka
Skaga stave church

References

External links 

 Tiveden National Park from the Swedish Environmental Protection Agency

Forests of Sweden
Geography of Örebro County
Tourist attractions in Örebro County
Geography of Västra Götaland County
Tourist attractions in Västra Götaland County